Travel guitars are small guitars with a full or nearly full scale-length. In contrast, a reduced scale-length is typical for guitars intended for children, which have scale-lengths of one-quarter (ukulele guitar, or guitalele), one-half, and three-quarter.

Examples 
Examples of travel guitars include the following:

C. F. Martin
 Model: Backpacker.
A very small guitar with a body shaped like an elongated triangle, similar in shape to certain types of psaltery, and designed to be very portable and inexpensive while still being constructed of quality woods. The guitar is famous for having originally been designed by Robert McAnally before Martin took over the design, and was the first guitar to be taken into space. The guitar has also been taken up Mount Everest

 Model: Little Martin

Taylor
 Model: Baby Taylor

Gallery

See also 
 Parlor guitar — various small size guitars; historically, smaller than C. F. Martin Concert guitar (size 0) released in 1854; or in today, smaller than C. F. Martin Auditorium (size 000) or Orchestra Model guitar (size OM).

External links 

Guitars

de:Gitarre#Silent/Traveller Guitar